Pumpkin Ridge Golf Club is a championship golf club in the northwest United States, located in North Plains, Oregon, northwest of Portland. The award-winning 36-hole club opened  in 1992 and has hosted several major golf tournaments, including the U.S. Women's Open in 1997 and 2003 and the Safeway Classic on the LPGA Tour from 2009 through 2012. The Witch Hollow course is private; the Ghost Creek course is public.

History
In 1986, Gay Davis and Marv French were shown  of farmland in rural Washington County just north of North Plains. The same day they looked at the property they made an offer and by late in 1987 they had an option for the property. Then in 1989 Pumpkin Ridge Partners was formed with French, Davis, and Barney Hyde. Next, in 1991 the group secured additional financing by bringing in Shigeru Ito as a 50-50 partner. The Japanese investor from Nagoya financed the $20 million golf club.

In August 1990, construction of the course began with American Golf Construction Company as the general contractor. The club opened on April 1, 1992, with the Ghost Creek course in operation. When Pumpkin Ridge opened, membership cost $37,500. The first hole-in-one recorded was by Bob Staab of Portland in June 1992. In September 1997 National Golf Properties purchased a 50 percent stake in the golf club and then leased the property to American Golf Corporation.

In 2003, the club had three of the top six best holes in the Portland area, including the best overall hole. LPGA hall of fame golfer Nancy Lopez named the 18th hole at Pumpkin Ridge in 1997's Women's U.S. Open her favorite hole in the world in 2005. Escalante Golf purchased the course in October 2015.

Tournaments
Since 1993, Pumpkin Ridge has hosted nationally significant tournaments, which started with the Nike Tour Championship that year and again in 1994 at Ghost Creek. In 1996, Pumpkin Ridge hosted the men's U.S. Amateur, where 20-year-old Tiger Woods won his unprecedented third consecutive title on the Witch Hollow course and then turned professional, with Nike founder Phil Knight on hand. This event had the highest attendance in the history of the U.S. Amateur, with attendance for the week at 65,353 to watch Woods rally and win the final over Steve Scott on the 38th hole. The U.S. Women's Open was played at Witch Hollow in 1997 and 2003.

The U.S. Junior Amateur (boys') and Girls' Junior Championships were held at Pumpkin Ridge in 2000, contested on both courses with the finals at Ghost Creek. And in 2006, Witch Hollow hosted the U.S. Women's Amateur, where Kimberly Kim won the title as the youngest winner ever for that tournament.

From 2009 to 2012, the Ghost Creek course hosted the Safeway Classic on the LPGA Tour, currently played in mid-August. In 2013, the tournament was moved back to Portland, played at Columbia Edgewater Country Club.

Beginning in 2014, the Witch Hollow course has hosted the WinCo Foods Portland Open on the Korn Ferry Tour.

In 2022, Pumpkin Ridge hosted the second event of the controversial LIV Golf Invitational Series.

Ghost Creek Golf Course

The Ghost Creek course was the first course to open, with play starting April 1, 1992. It was then named the best new public course in the country for the year by Golf Digest. Later it was named as the fifth best public course by Golf magazine in 1996. For 2007-08 Golf Digest ranked it 68th in the country public golf courses. The par 71 Ghost Creek Course has won several other national awards. This Robert E. Cupp and John Fought designed golf course is 6,839 yards long. In Zagat's "2006/07 Guide To America's Top Golf Courses", the club's Ghost Creek course was named fourth most popular in the Northwest. On that same course  the 14th hole was named one of the 100 toughest holes in golf  in the book "Golf's 100 Toughest Holes."

Witch Hollow Golf Course
In 1992 when the Witch Hollow course opened, Golf Digest selected it as the second best new private course of the year. This 18 hole course was designed by Robert E. Cupp. The par 72, 7,017 yard design has a rating of 75.1 and had two of the top 500 holes in the world in 2000 as rated by Golf Magazine. Golf Magazine in 2005 and 2006 rated it as one of the 100 best modern course in America.

See also

List of sports venues in Portland, Oregon
Tiger Woods PGA Tour 2006
Tiger Woods PGA Tour 07

References

External links

Golf clubs and courses in Oregon
Golf clubs and courses designed by John Fought
Golf clubs and courses designed by Robert E. Cupp
Buildings and structures in Washington County, Oregon
Sports venues completed in 1992
1992 establishments in Oregon